109 by AKB48
 "10.20 From Shibuya" by Corduroy (band)
 "30 Seconds Over Tokyo" by Pere Ubu
 "A French Man In Tokyo" by Talamasca
 "A History Of Tokyo Rail Traction" by John Fahey (musician)
 "Akasaka After Dark" by Brenda Lee; Del Kacher And His Sonics
 "All The Way From Tokyo" by Elliott Murphy
 "Anarchy in Tokyo" by 30 Seconds to Mars
 "Aoyama Dub" by Hi Tech Roots Dynamics
 "Asakusa Dub" by Hi Tech Roots Dynamics
 "Asakusa Rock" by Lizard
 "Attention Tokyo" by Human Audio Sponge
 "Awake In Neo Tokyo" by Freez-E-Style	(techno)
 "Azabu Dub" by Hi Tech Roots Dynamics
 "Back In Tokio" by Yellow Magic Orchestra
 "Back To Tokyo" by Axelle
 "Black Tokyo" by Aux 88
 "Blue Tokyo" by Subaeris
 "Blues From Tokyo" by Creation (Japanese band)
 "Boogie Man Lives In Tokyo" by Ryojiro Furusawa & Lee Oskar
 "Boulevard" by Dan Byrd
 "Boy King Of Tokyo" by Bill Lloyd (country musician))
 "Breakfast In Tokyo" by Ratko Zjaca, John Patitucci, Steve Gadd, Stanislav Mitrovic, Randy Brecker
 "Bushwick To Shin-Juku" by Finsta Bundy
 "Cheap Cheap Cheaper (Tokyo Theme)" by The Monotones
 "Come In Tokyo" by Huevos Rancheros
 "Dateline: Tokyo" by Brock Walsh
 "Daybreak In Tokyo" by Ralph Stanley
 "Dig You Later (A Hubba-Hubba-Hubba)" by Perry Como
 "Don't Make Me Wait" by Bomb The Bass
 "Downtown Tokyo" by Peter Parker's Rock N Roll Club
 "Dusted" by Leftfield
 "East Side/West Side" by Slow Pain
 "Escape From Tokyo" by DJ Evolution
 "Evening On Tokyo's Sumida" by Norrie Paramor
 "Fancy" by Iggy Azalea
 "Fast Train To Tokyo" by Rita MacNeil
 "Five Bells Over Tokyo" by Peeni Waali
 "Flight To Tokyo" by Electronic System
 "Foreign Prince Of Tokyo" by Alan Merrill
 "From Rome To Tokyo" by Turning Point
 "From Tokyo To Frisco" by Maria Verano
 "From Tokyo To London" by East Meets West
 "Get Up! (Before the Night Is Over)(J-Wave Mix)" by Technotronic
 "Ginza" by Johnny Moore (trumpeter)
 "Ginza Dub" by Hi Tech Roots Dynamics
 "Ginza Lights" by The Ventures
 "Ginza Ska" by The Ventures
 "Go Go Go Tokyo" by The Rubinoos
 "Gomen ne Tokyo" by Misaki Iwasa
 "Good Morning Tokyo!" by Tokyo's Revenge
 "Goodnight Tokyo" by Jackie O
 "Gunjou Biyori" by Tokyo Jihen
 "Hammersmith To Tokyo And Back" by Art of Noise
 "Hand Held In Black And White" by Dollar (band)
 "Harajuko Dub" by Hi Tech Roots Dynamics
 "(Heart of) Tokyo" by She One
 "Heartache All Over The World" by Elton John
 "'Here I Go To Tokio', Said Barnacle Bill, The Sailor" by Carson Robison
 "Hero In Tokyo" by Burn The Negative
 "Hobo Scratch" by Malcolm McLaren
 "Hongkong – Tokyo" by Hubert Kah
 "I was Born in Tokio" by Charles Lecocq, Gustave Kerker and Charles Alfred Byrne
 "JAL To Tokyo" by Underworld
 "Jet Stream Tokyo" by Humanoid Brian Dougans
 "Kamata Hollywood City" by Gun Club
 "Ke-Toky-I-O" by The Sportsmen (featuring Thurl Ravenscroft)
 "Keys In Tokyo" by Chris Silvertune featuring Anja
 "Left My Heart in Tokyo" by Mini Viva
 "Let's Go To Tokyo" by TQ
 "Lexington Queen" by Ryuichi Sakamoto (Lexington Queen was the name of a nightclub in Tokyo)
 "Life in Tokyo" by Gruppo Sportivo
 "Life in Tokyo" by Japan
 "Livin' Tokyo" by Faust
 "Lost in Tokyo" by SUPER GIRLS
 "Love From Tokyo" by Rita Coolidge
 "Love In Tokyo" by The Honeycombs
 "Love You Tokyo" by Sam Taylor (saxophonist)
 "Loved In Tokyo" by Max Zero
 "Mejuro Dub" by Hi Tech Roots Dynamics
 *Midnight In Tokyo" by Addy Flor
 "Midnight In Tokyo" by Cornerstone
 "Midnight In Tokyo" by Ian Mitchell (musician) Band
 "Midnight In Tokyo" by Joe Lynn Turner
 "Midnight In Tokyo" by Tokyo Boys
 "Midnight In Tokyo" by Y&T
 "Mon Amour Tokyo" by Pizzicato Five
 "My Army of Lovers" by Army of Lovers
 "My Private Tokyo" by Vicious Pink
 "Nairobi To London" by Jahawi (on a Solarstone album}
 "Nanstans I Tokyo" by Hasse C
 "Narita" by Riot
 "Narita Express" by Russ Gabriel
 "Navy Blue" by Diane Renay
 "New Tokyo Blue Mood" by Subaeris
 "New York – Rio – Tokyo" by Trio Rio
 "Night In Tokyo" by Nahki, Tony & Chris (reggae)
 "Night Train To Tokyo" by Laurel Aitken
 "Nightflight To Tokyo" by Roger Bennet
 "Nightlife In Tokyo" by Harold Mabern Trio
 "Ohayo Tokyo" by Alcatrazz
 "Ohio To Tokyo" by The Lilac Street Band
 "On The Ginza" by Wayne Shorter
 "One Night In Tokyo" by Arthur Lyman
 "One Night In Tokyo" by Bad Moon Rising
 "One Rainy Night In Tokyo" by Brenda Lee
 "Ooglie, Ooglie, Oogie (The Tokyo Boogie)" by Moon Mullican
 "Piscine A Tokyo" by Opera Multi Steel
 "Pit Inn" by Fruitcake
 "Radio Tokyo" by Devin Payne
 "Radio Tokyo" by Marvelous 3
 "Radio Tokyo" by Yellow Power (Tony Carey)
 "Rainy Night In Tokyo" by Michael Franks
 "Rock And Roll In Tokyo" by G.I. Jap
 "Roof Tops Of Tokyo" by Billy Vaughn
 "Roppongi" by Jeff Baxter, Teddy Castellucci, James Harrah, Buzz Feiten
 "Roppongi Crossing" by Rob Mullins
 "Roppongi Panic" by Candy Dulfer
 "Roppongi Street" by The Nolans
 "Roppongi Suicide" by Asia Gang
 "Roppongi Roppongi" by Vodka Collins
 "Salsa Rappsody" by Modern Romance
 "Saturday Night In Tokyo" by Ian McDonald
 "Sayonara Tokyo" by Singing Melody
 "Secret Of Tokyo" by Kazumi Watanabe
 "Shibuya Dub" by Hi Tech Roots Dynamics
 "Shibuya Screen" by Bill Nelson
 "Shinjuku Dub" by Hi Tech Roots Dynamics
 "Shinjuku Twilight" by Eddie Higgins
 "Shintaro" by Men at Work
 "Shower" by The Mountain Goats
 "Sound From Shinjuku" by Ital Horns Meets Bush Chemists (featuring Rico Rodriguez)
 "Straight To Stereo (Tokyo-London)" by Dr Calculus (featured Stephen Duffy)
 "Street Angels, Tokyo" by Frank Chickens
 "Summer In Tokyo" by Azymuth
 "Sunrise in Tokyo" by Joe Henderson
 "Sunrise in Tokyo" by Tokyo Blade
 "Sunshine In Tokyo" by Tirez Tirez
 "Superstar In Tokyo" by Hot Cold
 "Take Me Back To Tokyo" by Mega NRG Man
 "Talk You All Tight(Dedicated To The City Of Tokyo)" by Kazumi Band (featuring Kazumi Watanabe)
 "Taste Of Tokyo" by Band Of Pleasure (features James Gadson)
 "Teatime In Tokyo" by Helmut Zacharias
 "Teknokyo" by DHS
 "Theme From Tokyo Bullet" by Powdered Rhino Horns
 "The Third Chamber: Part 5 – 7pm Tokyo Shrine by Loop Guru
 "This Is Tokyo Rose" by Tokyo Rose
 "Ticket To Tokyo" by Mal Waldron & Jim Pepper
 "Time In Tokyo" by Bill Nelson
 "Time Is A Passer-By (In Tokyo)" by Frank Chickens
 "TOKYO!!" by Sana TOKYO!!
 "Tokio" by Bit-Max
 "Tokio" by Jack Payne (bandleader)
 "Tokio" by Kenji Sawada
 "Tokio" by Laura Branigan
 "Tokio" by Lenny Mac Dowell
 "Tokio" by Liverpool Five
 "Tokio 1964" by Peter Kreuder
 "Tokio Airport" by Metal Boys
 "Tokio Bang!" by Soft Ballet
 "Tokio Blues" by Irving Berlin
 "Tokio Dream" by Makoto Horiuchi
 "Tokio Lovers" by Pepe Jaramillo
 "Tokyo" by 10cc
 "Tokyo" by A Flock of Seagulls
 "Tokyo" by ADX
 "Tokyo" by At Vance
 "Tokyo" by Athlete (from their album Beyond the Neighbourhood)
 "Tokyo" by Attack
 "Tokyo" by Base Ball Bear (from their album Detective Boys)
 "Tokyo" by The Books
 "Tokyo" by Brian Ice
 "Tokyo" by Bruce Cockburn (from his album Humans; #44 on RPM in 1980)
 "Tokyo" by B'z (from their album Love Me, I Love You)
 "Tokyo" by Carola Häggkvist
 "Tokyo" by Chips
 "Tokyo" by Classix Nouveaux
 "Tokyo" by Danny Saucedo (from his album Heart Beats)
 "Tokyo" by Darrell Mansfield Band
 "Tokyo" by David Boydell
"Tokyo" by Dirty Looks
 "Tokyo" by Dollar
 "Tokyo" by Donna Summer
 "Tokyo" by Eikichi Yazawa (from his album Heart)
 "Tokyo" by Fargo
 "Tokyo" by Forcefield III
 "Tokyo" by Gabi Delgado
 "Tokyo" by GaGaGa SP
 "Tokyo" by Geoffrey Downes & The New Dance Orchestra
 "Tokyo" by Gruppo Sportivo
 "Tokyo" by Hans Vandenburg & Ajax Supporters
 "Tokyo" by Hirakawachi Itchōme
 "Tokyo" by Hurricane
 "Tokyo" by Imagine Dragons
 "Tokyo" by Jerry Donahue
 "Tokyo" by Jinco
 "Tokyo" by Keisuke Kuwata
 "Tokyo" by Kururi
 "Tokyo" by Legendary Stardust Cowboy
 "Tokyo" by Lianne La Havas
 "Tokyo" by Lil' Mark
 "Tokyo" by Lili & Sussie
 "Tokyo" by Masaharu Fukuyama
 "Tokyo" by Masashi Sada (from his album Yume Kaikisen)
 "Tokyo" by Mr. Children (from their album Supermarket Fantasy)
 "Tokyo" by My Pace
 "Tokyo" by Nevada
 "Tokyo" by Numbers Radio
 "Tokyo" by Owl City
 "Tokyo" by Paul Oakenfold
 "Tokyo" by Remioromen (from their album Kachou Fuugetsu)
 "Tokyo" by RM (rapper) of BTS
 "Tokyo" by Richie Beirach
 "Tokyo" by Rikki and the Last Days of Earth
 "Tokyo" by Rockwell
 "Tokyo" by Rod McKuen
 "Tokyo" by Science
 "Tokyo" by Shogo Hamada
 "Tokyo" by Sound Tribe Sector 9
 "Tokyo" by Steve Gibbs
 "Tokyo" by Sunny Day Service
 "Tokyo" by Telekinesis
 "Tokyo" by The Thompson Twins
 "Tokyo" by Tino Casal
 "Tokyo" by Tokyo (Robby Musenbichler)
 "Tokyo" by Toshinori Kondo, Eraldo Bernocchi, Bill Laswell
 "Tokyo" by Unsteady
 "Tokyo" by Vinyl Theatre
 "Tokyo" by Warren Carr
 "Tokyo" by White Lies
 "Tokyo" by The Wombats
 "Tokyo" by Yashiki Takajin (from his album Mood Yume Miru Otoko)
 "Tokyo" by Yoeko Kurahashi
 "Tokyo" by Yui
 "Tokyo Alley" by ***** Hyman
 "Tokyo Amazon" by Stroke
 "Tokyo Bay Blues" by Ann Lewis (musician)
 "Tokyo Bijin" by Yuko Nakazawa
 "Tokyo Biyori" by Tomiko Van
 "Tokyo Blue" by Charles McPherson (musician)
 "Tokyo Blue" by Najee
 "Tokyo Blues" by Horace Silver
 "Tokyo Blues" by John Kaizan Neptune
 "Tokyo Blues" by Mark Lindsay
 "Tokyo Boogie Boogie Night" by Keito Saito & Axel Zwingenberger
 "Tokyo Bootlegger Man" by David Lindley (musician)
 "Tokyo Boy" by Ra
 "Tokyo Boy" by Sandra Kim
 "Tokyo Breaks" by Tilt (British band)
 "Tokyo Butterfly" by Jerry Smith
 "Tokyo By Night" by Gina T
 "Tokyo By Night" by Hook N Sling Ft. Karin Park
 "Tokyo By Night" by Toshiro Mayuzumi
 "Tokyo City" by The Slickers
 "Tokyo Cosmopolitan" by Jamaaladeen Tacuma
 "Tokyo Dawn" by Doc Scott
 "Tokyo Days" by Yuna Ito
 "Tokyo Dreamer" by Beat Culture
 "Tokyo Drift (Fast and the Furious)" by Teriyaki Boyz
 "Tokyo Drift" by Bass Mekanik
 "Tokyo Drift" by Yung Lean
 "Tokyo Drive" by Aux 88
 "Tokyo Drive" by TOKIO
 "Tokyo Dub" by Juno Reactor
 "Tokyo Express" by Starfish Pool
 "Tokyo Express" by Subtara
"Tokyo Fantasy" by Alessandra Mussolini
 "Tokyo Fever" by J Boss Band (Jürgen Boss)
 "Tokyo Flyer" by  Rah Band
 "Tokyo Girl" by Ace of Base
 "Tokyo Girl" by Guru Guru
 "Tokyo Girl" by Michael Fortunati (entry on Italian Wikipedia)
 "Tokyo Girl" by Minako Honda
 "Tokyo Girl" by Shogun
 "Tokyo Girls" by Tik and Tok
 "Tokyo Glitterati" by Vector Lovers
 "Tokyo Guitar" by Hank Marvin
 "Tokyo Heartwash" by Glamorous Hooligan
 "Tokyo High Life" by Dieter Reith
 "Tokyo Highway" by Kyary Pamyu Pamyu
 "Tokyo Hotel Room" by Woodpigeon + Norman Blake
 "Tokyo Is Calling" by Marko Albrecht (under the name 'Mark 'Oh')
 "Tokyo Joe" by Bertie Higgins
 "Tokyo Joe" by Bryan Ferry
 "Tokyo Joe" by Matchbox (band)
 "Tokyo Joe (One Roll From Paradise)" by Wigwam (Finnish band)
 "Tokyo Kid" by Jean-Michel Jarre
 "Tokyo Lady" by Masayoshi Takanaka
 "Tokyo Love" by Cargoe
 "Tokyo Love Hotel" by Rina Sawayama
 "Tokyo Mater" by Winged Beat
 "Tokyo Melody" by Helmut Zacharias
 "Tokyo Midnight" by Ai Otsuka
 "Tokyo Night" by Mandy Gordon
 "Tokyo Nights" by Bandzai!
 "Tokyo Nights" by Bee Gees
 "Tokyo Nights" by Krokus
  Tokyo Nights" by Nick Stoynoff (on album by Solarstone)
 "Tokyo Nights" by Room 101
 "Tokyo Nights" by Rob Mullins
 "Tokyo Nights" by The Ventures
 "Tokyo Nights" by Zane And Hogan With Kibbe
 "Tokyo Nitelife" by Eskobar (a drum and bass tune)
 "Tokyo No Yoake" by Deep Rooted
 "Tokyo, Oklahoma" by John Anderson
 "Tokyo Olympiad" by Toshiro Mayuzumi
 "Tokyo Pace" by John Kaizan Neptune
 "Tokyo Panorama" by Toshiro Mayuzumi
 "Tokyo Polka" by Country Fever
 "Tokyo Racer" by Les Jardiniers
 "Tokyo Rain" by Fetus Productions
 "Tokyo Rain" by Mastermind
 "Tokyo Return" by Dave Grusin
 "Tokyo Rimshot" by The Walker Brothers
 "Tokyo Rising" by Burning Rain
 "Tokyo Rising" by Nikki Richards
 "Tokyo Road" by Stranger
 "Tokyo Road" by Bon Jovi
 "Tokyo Rock'n Rollers" by 5X
 "Tokyo Room" by Peter Daltrey and Damien Youth
 "Tokyo Rose" by Chapman Whitney
 "Tokyo Rose" by David Feinstein (from Elf (band))
 "Tokyo Rose" by Focus
 "Tokyo Rose" by The Good Men
 "Tokyo Rose" by Hogsnort Rupert
 "Tokyo Rose" by Idle Eyes
 "Tokyo Rose" by Kamikaze
 "Tokyo Rose" by Riot
 "Tokyo Rose" by The Rods
 "Tokyo Rose" by Shok Paris
 "Tokyo Rose" by UK Subs
 "Tokyo Rose Sings The Blues" by Richie Cole (musician)
 "Tokyo Rush" by Brisk & Vagabond vs. Uraken
 "Tokyo Sally" by Creation (Japanese band)
 "Tokyo Scenario" by Unison Square Garden
 "Tokyo-Scope" by The Mitgang Audio
 "Tokyo Shuffle" by Breakfast Band
 "Tokyo...Singin' In The City" by Masayoshi Takanaka
 "Tokyo Smoke” by Cage the Elephant
 "Tokyo Sound Machine" by T-Square (band)
 "Tokyo Soundscape" by The Clarke & Ware Experiment (Vince Clarke & Martyn Ware)
 "Tokyo Stealth Fighter" by Dave Angel
 "Tokyo Storm Warning" by Elvis Costello
 "Tokyo Streets" by Glamour Cult
 "The Tokyo Story" by Happy Ever After
 "Tokyo Subway" by Slam (band)
 "Tokyo Sue" by Susan
 "Tokyo Summer" by Mounties
 "Tokyo Sun" by Russ Gabriel
 "Tokyo Sunrise" by LP
 "Tokyo Sunset" by Peter Weekers & Francis Goya
 "Tokyo Taxi" by The Accadians
 "Tokyo Telacom" by Aux 88
 "Tokyo to iu katasumi" by Morning Musume
 "Tokyo Tiger" by 22 Pistepirkko
 "Tokyo To Kokomo" by Peter Gallway
 "Tokyo Tokyo" by 808 State
 "Tokyo Tokyo" by D-Essex
 "Tokyo Tokyo" by Die Raketen
 "Tokyo Town" by Sarah
 "Tokyo Town Pages" by HASYMO (an alias of Yellow Magic Orchestra)
 "Tokyo Traffic" by Hot Lizard
 "Tokyo Trains" by David Harrow
 "Tokyo Travel" by The Future Sound of London
 "Tokyo Twilight" by Santo & Johnny
 "Tokyo Twist" by Tone Band
 "Tokyo (Vampires & Wolves)" by The Wombats
 "Tokyo Vibes" by Hypertrophy
 "Tokyo Voix" by Gennaro Le Fosse
 "Tokyo (We Want To Go To)" by Komputer
 "Tokyo Woman" by Roy Gaines & Mitsuyoshi Azuma
 "Tokyorio" by Chaplin Band
 "Tokyo's Burning" by Anarchy
 "Tokyo's Burning" by Genuine Brandish
 "Tokyo's Coolest Sound" by Pizzicato Five
 "Tokyo's On Fire" by W.A.S.P.
 "Tokyo's Theme" by Roland Alphonso
 "Tony Goes To Tokyo (And Rides The Bullet Train)" by The Revox Cadets
 "Tonight in Tokyo" by Sandie Shaw
 "Touch" by Lori and the Chameleons
 "Train To Tokyo" by Thomas Schumacher & Toby Izui (techno tune)
 "Trip To Tokyo" by Dekstrom
 "The Trip To Tokyo" by Nollaig Casey & Arty McGlynn
 "Truth (Tokyo Noir)" by Time Machine
 "Turn Around In Tokyo" by The Babys
 "Twilight In Tokyo" by Buck Ram
 "Two 'D's From Shinjyuku, Dig & Dug" by Billy Harper & Jon Faddis
 "Ueno Park 5AM" by Mario Piu & Jurgen Cecconi
 "Una Sera Di Tokio" by Sandra Alexandra
 "Utsukushii Shibuya" by Ozma
 "Vienna Calling" by Falco
 "Wake Up" by Hilary Duff
 "Walk In Tokyo" by Gladstone Anderson
 "Welcome to Tokyo" by Sandaime J Soul Brothers from Exile Tribe
 "Welcome to Tokyo, Otis Clay" by Clinton
 "What’s The Time In Tokyo" by Marcella Detroit
 "When It's Cherry Time in Tokio" by James P. Johnson
 "When Tokyo?" by Eric Gale
 "Woman from Tokyo" by Deep Purple
 "Woman In Tokyo" by Mega NRG Man
 "Work Away Tokyo Day" by Andy Partridge
 "Y.S. Tangled In Tokyo" by Haruomi Hosono and Bill Laswell
 "You And Not Tokio" by Marquess feat Alexandra Ungureanu

Songs with videos of Tokyo 
These songs, while not having Tokyo in their names, lyrics, or in content, have, as their (promotional) videos, scenes of Tokyo.

 "I Love The Things You Do To Me" by Balaam and the Angel
 "Love Missile F1-11" by Sigue Sigue Sputnik
 "Just Can't Get Enough" by The Black Eyed Peas
 "Motorcycle Emptiness" by The Manic Street Preachers
 "Rather Be" by Clean Bandit featuring Jess Glynne
 "SuperLove" by Charli XCX
Loca by Álvaro Soler
 The video for "I Will Possess Your Heart" by Death Cab for Cutie was shot in New York City, London, Paris, Frankfurt, Tokyo, Hokkaido, Tunis, Carthage, Bangkok, Siem Reap, and Phnom Penh.

References 

Tokyo
 
Songs